Brij Lal is a 1977-batch IPS officer and an Indian politician.
He is a Member of Parliament  in the Rajya Sabha from Uttar Pradesh. He belongs to the Bharatiya Janata Party. He was the Director General of Police of Uttar Pradesh during the Mayawati Government. he belong to the Koli community of Uttar Pradesh.

In 2018, the Government of Uttar Pradesh appointed him as the head of scheduled caste and scheduled tribes commission in the state.
Indian Police Service

After his retirement he has been active in Dalit politics. He has emerged as one of the strong Dalit leaders of the party.

Police career

Indian Police Service 
He is a 1977-batch IPS officer. He held the charge of Special Director General (law and order) of UP Police. He has held many positions like ADG Law & order and crime, Anti-Terror Squad (ATS) and Special Task Force (STF).

Uttar Pradesh DGP
He Worked As Director General Of Uttar Pradesh Police from 30 September 2011 to 8 January 2012

Medals by President of India
   
 President's Police Medal for Distinguished Services.
 Police Medal for Long and Meritorious Services.
 Police Medal for Gallantry.
 BAR to Police Medal for Gallantry.

Other medals and decorations
   
 Uttar Pradesh Chief Minister’s, Police Medal for Outstanding Services with 25000/- Rupees Cash Reward.
 Rs. 1 Lakh cash Reward by Delhi Police for Liquidating a Notorious Mafia of Delhi in 1992. 
 Rs. 3 Lakh cash Reward by Uttar Pradesh Government for Anti-Dacoity Operations in Chambal and Patha area of U.P.
 D.G. RPF Insignia (Silver Disk) for Bravery.

Politics
He was considered a close-aide of former Chief Minister and BSP chief Mayawati. However, In 2015 after he retired he joined the Bharatiya Janata Party.

In 2020, he was nominated to the Rajya Sabha from Uttar Pradesh.

In 2020 he said,

Books published
 Siyasat ka Sabak (Jogendra Nath Mandal).
 Indian Mujahidin (Nishane Par Gujarat).
 Police ki Barat, (Pashchimi U.P. Gangwar, Phoolan Devi aur Chambal Gangs.) 
 Dedh Biswa Zameen (Purvi U.P. Gangwar aur Lucknow ke Rangbaaz)

Other prestigious awards
Awarded “Acharya Narendra Dev Purskar” of RS. 2.5 Lakhs by “U.P. Hindi Sansthan” for book ‘Siyasat ka Sabak’ (Jogendra Nath Mandal)

See also
Law enforcement in India

References

Koli people
Living people
Year of birth missing (living people)
Director Generals of Uttar Pradesh Police
Bharatiya Janata Party politicians from Uttar Pradesh
Rajya Sabha members from Uttar Pradesh
Indian Police Service officers